Alexey Igorevich Sheynin  (born December 18, 1947, Leningrad) is a Soviet and Russian actor of drama theater and cinema.

Biography
Born in Leningrad on December 18, 1947.

In 1968 he graduated from the theater studio at the Leningrad Youth Theater (course of Zinovy Korogodsky). Worked at the Leningrad Comedy Theater. Since 1970 he works at the Yermolova Theatre.  He graduated from the Institute of Culture (directing faculty).

Teacher of GITIS. He also teaches at the Russian Theater Institute.

Personal life 
 First wife actress Nelly Pshennaya. In this marriage was born daughter  Yeugenia. In 2015, her daughter died of cancer.
 Second wife Annie, twice champion of France in jumping.

Awards
 Honored Artist of the RSFSR (1985)
 People's Artist of Russia (1999)

References

External links

  Алексей Шейнин на сайте Театра «Школа драматического искусства»

1947 births
Living people
Soviet male film actors
Soviet male stage actors
Soviet male television actors
Russian male film actors
Russian male stage actors
Russian male television actors
20th-century Russian male actors
People's Artists of Russia
Honored Artists of the RSFSR
Male actors from Saint Petersburg